Carl William Count Ahlefeldt-Laurvig (2 May 1860 – 29 November 1923) was a Danish politician and diplomat. He was Minister of Foreign Affairs from 1908 to 1909 and 1910 to 1913.

References 

1860 births
1923 deaths
Foreign ministers of Denmark
Danish counts
Danish diplomats
Commanders First Class of the Order of the Dannebrog
House of Ahlefeldt